Circaetus, the snake eagles, is a genus of medium-sized eagles in the bird of prey family Accipitridae. They are mainly resident African species, but the migratory short-toed snake eagle breeds from the Mediterranean basin into Russia, the Middle East and India, and winters in sub-Saharan Africa and east to Indonesia.

Snake eagles are found in open habitats like cultivated plains arid savanna, but require trees in which to build a stick nest. The single egg is incubated mainly or entirely by the female.

Circaetus eagles have a rounded head and broad wings. They prey on reptiles, mainly snakes, but also take lizards and occasionally small mammals.

Taxonomy and species
The genus Circaetus was introduced in 1816 by the French ornithologist Louis Jean Pierre Vieillot to accommodate a single species, the short-toed snake eagle, which is therefore considered the type species. The genus name is from the Ancient Greek kirkos, a type of hawk, and aetos, "eagle". The genus contains six species.

Fossil record
Circaetus rhodopensis (late Miocene of Bulgaria)

Circaetus haemusensis (early Pleistocene of Bulgaria)

References

 
Bird genera
 
Eagles
Taxa named by Louis Jean Pierre Vieillot